The 2014 Danish Figure Skating Championships was held in Herlev from December 6 through 8, 2013. Skaters competed in the disciplines of men's singles, ladies' singles, and ice dancing on the levels of senior, junior, novice, and the pre-novice levels of debs, springs, and cubs. The results were used to choose the teams to the 2014 Winter Olympics, the 2014 World Championships, the 2013 European Figure Skating Championships, the 2014 Nordic Championships, and the 2014 World Junior Championships.

Results

Men

Ladies

Ice dancing

External links
 2014 Danish Championships results
 Dansk Skøjte Union

Danish Figure Skating Championships
2013 in figure skating
Danish Figure Skating Championships, 2014
Figure Skating Championships